Bioorganic & Medicinal Chemistry Letters is a scientific journal focusing on the results of research on the molecular structure of biological organisms and the interaction of biological targets with chemical agents. It is published by Elsevier, which also publishes Bioorganic & Medicinal Chemistry for longer works.

Biochemistry journals
Elsevier academic journals
English-language journals
Medicinal chemistry journals